Rhian Samuel (born Aberdare, Wales, 1944) is a Welsh woman composer who resided in the USA for many years. She has composed over 140 published works, including orchestral, chamber, vocal, and choral music.  She now divides her time between mid-Wales and London.

Composition
Samuel's orchestral music spans from Elegy-Symphony (St. Louis Symphony Orchestra, Leonard Slatkin, cond., 1981) to Tirluniau/Landscapes (BBC commission, BBC NOW, BBC Proms 2000); in 1983 she won the ASCAP/Rudolf Nissim Prize (USA) for her choral/orchestral work, La Belle Dame sans Merci.  A BIS CD containing her BBC-commissioned work for soprano and orchestra, Clytemnestra, was short listed for a Gramophone Award in 2020. As well as orchestral song-cycles (Clytemnestra and The White Amaryllis), she has written a large number of voice-and-piano cycles for major festivals including the Oxford Lieder Festival (Wildflower Songbook, to poems by Anne Stevenson), the Three Choirs Festival (A Swift Radiant Morning, to poems by WWI poet, Charles Sorley, the Fishguard Festival, UK (Cerddi Hynafol/Ancient Songs, to anonymous early Welsh texts), and the Ludlow English Song Weekend (The Moon and I, to poems by Anne Stevenson and Tabitha Hayward) and has written music for choirs including New College Choir (Oxford), the BBC Singers, and a number of American college choirs as well as her own choirs at Reading University and City University, London. She has also written about music: as co-editor of the New Grove (Norton) Dictionary of Women Composers, she has been prominent on issues concerning the reception of music by women. She has also written on the operas of Harrison Birtwistle; she was commissioned by the Royal Opera House, Covent Garden, to write programme essays on both Gawain and The Minotaur and subsequently published diaries of their first productions. Amongst many CDs which contain her compositions, one entirely devoted to her chamber music, Light and Water, is issued on the Deux-Elles label, and another, Songs of Earth and Air, to her music for baritone and piano, on the Lorelt label. In 2006 she was awarded the Glyndŵr Award for an Outstanding Contribution to the Arts in Wales and in 2016 she was awarded an Hon DMus by the University of Wales.

Her Path Through the Woods for recorder and strings was premiered at Temple of Peace, Cardiff, in April 2011 by Pamela Thorby and the Welsh Sinfonia, conducted by Mark Eager.

Education
Samuel was educated at Reading University (BA, BMus) in the UK and Washington University in St. Louis (MA, PhD), and joined the teaching staff of City University, London in 1995, where she became Professor of Music in 1999 and is now Emeritus Professor. While there, she also supervised the research of  post-graduate students at the Guildhall School of Music and Drama. Later, she taught composition at Magdalen College, Oxford (2007–2016). Previously, she taught at the University of Reading (1984–95, as Head of Department, 1993–95) and at the St. Louis Conservatory, St. Louis.

References

External links
 

1944 births
Living people
20th-century British composers
21st-century British composers
20th-century British women musicians
21st-century British women musicians
20th-century classical composers
21st-century classical composers
20th-century Welsh educators
21st-century Welsh educators
20th-century Welsh musicians
21st-century Welsh musicians
20th-century Welsh women writers
21st-century Welsh women writers
21st-century Welsh writers
20th-century women composers
21st-century women composers
20th-century women educators
21st-century women educators
Welsh scholars and academics
Welsh classical composers
People from Aberdare
Academics of City, University of London
Academics of the University of Reading
Academics of the University of Oxford
Alumni of the University of Reading
Women classical composers
British writers about music
Women writers about music
Washington University in St. Louis alumni
Welsh women academics